Goundam Airport  is an airstrip serving Goundam in Mali.

See also
Transport in Mali
List of airports in Mali

References

External links
 OurAirports - Mali
 Goundam

Airports in Mali